Mount Barnard may refer to:

 Mount Barnard (Alsek Ranges), aka Boundary Peak 160, a mountain on the Alaska-British Columbia border
 Mount Barnard (California), a mountain in California
 Mount Barnard (Canada), a mountain on the British Columbia-Alberta border/Continental Divide in the Canadian Rockies